Ismelia carinata, the tricolour chrysanthemum, tricolor daisy, or annual chrysanthemum, is an ornamental plant native to north Africa that is cultivated as a garden plant and grows as a weed in California. It is the sole species in the genus Ismelia. It has been hybridized with related Argyranthemum species to create cultivars of garden marguerites.

References

Glebionidinae
Garden plants of North America
Monotypic Asteraceae genera
Flora of Africa